Helena Wiśniewska (born 18 April 1999) is a Polish sprint canoeist. At the 2020 Summer Olympics, she won a bronze medal in  Women's K-4 500 metres. At the 2019 European Games, she won a bronze medal.

Career 
She participated in the 2018 ICF Canoe Sprint World Championships where she won a medal. In 2019, she and her team won bronze in the ICF Canoe Sprint World Cup.

She competed at the 2019 ICF Canoe Sprint World Championships.

References

External links
 

Living people
1999 births
Polish female canoeists
ICF Canoe Sprint World Championships medalists in kayak
Canoeists at the 2019 European Games
European Games medalists in canoeing
European Games bronze medalists for Poland
Sportspeople from Bydgoszcz
Olympic canoeists of Poland
Canoeists at the 2020 Summer Olympics
Medalists at the 2020 Summer Olympics
Olympic bronze medalists for Poland
Olympic medalists in canoeing